"Suicidal" is a song by American rapper YNW Melly from his debut studio album Melly vs. Melvin (2019). It is YNW Melly's second song to enter the top 20, peaking at number 20 on the Billboard Hot 100, and his second highest-charting single as well, following "Murder on My Mind". A remix featuring Juice Wrld was released on March 13, 2020.

Background 
The song was originally released in November 2019 as a track from YNW Melly's debut studio album Melly vs. Melvin. The remix of the song, featuring Juice Wrld, was first previewed by Melly on Instagram on December 8, 2019, the same day that Juice Wrld died. It was announced on March 11, 2020, and released two days later, following the song's virality on TikTok. It is Juice's third posthumous feature, following his guest appearances on "Godzilla" by Eminem and "PTSD" by G Herbo.

Composition 
The lyrics deal with the consequences of anguish, hatred and depression that resulted from a contemptuous breakup. Melly sings about drinking Hennessy to forget about the relationship, only to worsen his condition by abusing alcohol. Thus, the love is described as "suicidal".

Charts

Weekly charts

Year-end charts

Certifications

References 

2019 songs
2020 singles
YNW Melly songs
Juice Wrld songs
Songs written by Juice Wrld
300 Entertainment singles
Emo rap songs
Songs about alcohol
Songs about heartache
Songs about suicide
Songs released posthumously